Hermann Hagedorn (20 August 1884 in Essen-Gerschede – 7 March 1951 near Fretter, Finnentrop,) was a German writer, lyric poet and teacher. He is the best known representative of Borbecksch, a German dialect.

Important works 
Hatte on Heeme. Plattdeutsche Dichtungen. 1930.
Honnenseelen. Geschichten von onse verbeenige Frönne. In niedersächsischer Mundart. 1938.
Kriegstagebauk. In niedersächsischer Mundart. 1940.
Hämann Ohme Joann. Stemmen uut Blaut on Äre. In niedersächsischer Mundart. 1941.
Ulenspeigel en Essen. 1941.
Märchenzauber. Twölf Märchen opp platt. 1951.
Fläutepiepen. 1956.
Dat Dubbelte-Dutzend-Bauk. 12 Geschichten, 12 Gedichte. 1959.

Notes

External links 

bvv-dellwig.de Poems of Hagedorn

1884 births
1951 deaths
Writers from Essen
20th-century German people
German male poets
20th-century German poets
20th-century German male writers